The University of the Fraser Valley (UFV), formerly known as University College of the Fraser Valley and Fraser Valley College, is a Canadian public university with campuses in Abbotsford, Chilliwack, Mission and Hope, British Columbia. Founded in 1974 as Fraser Valley College, it was a response to the need for expanded vocational training in the communities of the Fraser Valley.  In 1988, it became a university college, with degree-granting status. As the University College of the Fraser Valley, it grew rapidly, becoming one of the largest university colleges in Canada.

In recognition of the growing needs for higher education within the region and in the province, the provincial government granted full university status on 21 April 2008.  Student enrollment is now over 15,000 students annually.

In the 2010 The Globe and Mail Canadian University Report, UFV earned the most "A Range" grades of any post-secondary institution in British Columbia, receiving A grades in quality of education, student–faculty interaction, and ease of registration.

History

Beginnings

In the 1960s, citizens of the Fraser Valley demanded a post-secondary educational facility within the Fraser Valley.  In 1966, a proposal was rejected by the provincial government to found a junior college.  Not to be swayed by this early defeat, supporters who wanted post-secondary representation lobbied to have a vocational school built.  The proposed site for this vocational school was to be near the geographical centre of the Fraser Valley, on Lickman Road in Chilliwack.  This proposal passed, and plans for the school were put into motion.  However, with the election of a new provincial government in 1972, the school's development was put on hold.  Communities again lobbied for continuation of this project, and so a special task force was appointed by the government to study the feasibility of a college in the Fraser Valley.

The task force recommended a comprehensive regional college, providing university transfer, career and vocational programs.  A plebiscite was proposed to ask for taxpayer support on this endeavour, and passed with 89% in favour.  In reaction to this strong show of support, the provincial government announced the establishment of Fraser Valley College on April 4, 1974.

Only a few months of planning went into the new college before it opened its doors in September 1974. Since no new facilities had yet been built, classes were held in church basements, public schools, commercially rented spaces, and the Coqualeetza Education Centre.  Offices were set up in store fronts, community centres, and designated sections of public schools and school board offices.  During its first year, Fraser Valley College enrolled 183 full-time and over 2,300 part-time students.

Expansion
With student and community support, the provincial government approved university college status for some institutions. Three community colleges were granted authority to offer baccalaureate degrees following a 1988 government initiative designed to increase access to degree programs in British Columbia. Three institutions–Malaspina, Cariboo and Okanagan–were renamed university colleges. Fraser Valley College received university college status in 1991 (July 3) after an intense community campaign advocating for third- and fourth-year programming for the Fraser Valley.

In September 1991, the administrative Board officially changed its name to the University College of the Fraser Valley. Initially, the university colleges offered degrees under the aegis of one or more of four provincial universities (Simon Fraser University, the University of British Columbia, the University of Victoria) and the Open University. In 1994, the University College of the Fraser Valley established an undergraduate degree in adult education. In 1995, the university colleges were awarded the authority to grant degrees in their own right.

University status
On April 21, 2008, the Provincial Government announced its intention to amend the University Act at the Legislative Assembly of British Columbia to upgrade UCFV into a full university, called University of the Fraser Valley (UFV). The legislation renaming the University College to University received Royal Assent on May 29, 2008. The university officially began operation under the new name on September 1, 2008. The University of the Fraser Valley is presently ranked as the 57th best university in Canada and the 1824st best university worldwide.

Governance and academics
The administration of UFV, as mandated by the University Act, is composed of a chancellor, convocation, board, senate, and faculties of the university. The Board of Governors is responsible for the management of property and revenue, while the Senate is vested with managing the academic operation of the university. Both are composed of faculty and students who are elected to the position. Degrees and diplomas are conferred by the convocation, which is composed of alumni, administrators, and faculty, with a quorum of twenty members. UFV also has a President, who is a chief executive officer of the university and a member of the Senate, Board of Governors, Convocation, and also serves as Vice Chancellor. The President of the University is responsible for managing the academic operation of the university, including recommending appointments, calling meetings of faculties, and establishing committees.

Faculties and schools

UFV's academic activity is organized into "faculties", and "schools". Currently, the university has seven faculties and three schools. The College of Arts houses the two largest faculties (Humanities and Social Sciences) with sixteen departments, followed by the Faculty of Applied and Technical Studies, while the Faculty of Science has four departments, and the Faculty of Health Sciences has five programs.

Research

UFV is home to ten research centres and institutes; additionally, the Chilliwack Campus is the site of the new BC Centre of Excellence for Agriculture. Much of the research conducted at UFV, in particular through the activities of centres such as the Centre for Food and Farmland Innovation and the South Asian Studies Institute, focuses on issues of regional concern.

There are three Canada Research Chairs at UFV: Lenore Newman holds the Canada Research Chair in Food Security and the Environment; Keith Thor Carlson holds the Canada Research Chair in Indigenous and Community Engaged History; Cindy Jardine holds the Canada Research Chair in Health and Community. Additionally, Irwin Cohen holds an RCMP Senior Research Chair in Crime Reduction.

UFV is designated a Special Purpose, Teaching University under the University Act, with a mandate to focus on regional undergraduate education. However, faculty members are also actively engaged in research, and UFV places major emphasis on providing research opportunities for undergraduate students and training in research skills. Students have opportunities to apply for grants and lead research projects, to co-author papers with professors, and to present papers at international conferences. UFV also promotes and recognizes student research through its Undergraduate Research Excellence Award program.

Enrollment

In 2009/2010, the UFV individual student count (including Continuing Studies) was 15,446, including approximately 13,000 mainly undergraduate students. UFV's region has a rapidly expanding population that totaled 257,031 in 2006. Enrollment continues to grow. UFV exceeded the Ministry of Higher Education and Labour Market Development's funded target for 2009/10 of 6,859 student spaces by 104%.

Funding
Operating funding for UFV has increased by $19.8 million, from $33.5 million in 2001/02 to $53.3 million in 2010/11 – a 59.1 per cent increase.

Programs
UFV offers master's degrees, bachelor's degrees, associate degrees, diplomas, certificates and citations across a wide range of programs in fine arts, humanities, science, social sciences, applied communication, business, nursing, as well as technical and trade programs.

Program transferability
UFV offers many transferable courses to other educational institutions, which often lead to direct transfers into second-year or third-year studies at other post secondary institutions. To aid in this, UFV is a part of the BC Transfer Guide Website, a resource for planning and understanding transfer in the BC post-secondary education system.

Campuses

Abbotsford
The Abbotsford campus was UFV's first permanent campus, and opened its doors in 1983.  A new building, containing the main institution library, First Heritage Computer Access Centre, and other instructional and support areas, was opened in the fall of 1996.  In 1997, D Building, featuring classrooms, laboratories, and offices was opened. In 2002, the student activity centre and first gymnasium were opened.  2007 brought the opening of UFV's first student residence—Baker House, as well as an expanded gymnasium facility, with the ability to seat 1,500 people.

In 1978, trades programs started with a carpentry program.  Initially, this program was run from Portage Avenue in Chilliwack.  At the time, the land belonged to the Chilliwack School District, and the Ministry of Advanced Education funded the building of the carpentry shop. Originally, this shop was supposed to be handed over to the Chilliwack School District after 5 years, but it took nearly 12 years to secure the funding to build a replacement shop in Abbotsford. Other trades programs were based at the Abbotsford campus in Building C. In 1991, UCFV moved all trades programs to the Abbotsford campus. In 2007, UFV Trades and Technology programs moved into newly renovated facilities at the new Canada Education Park on the former Canadian Forces Base Chilliwack. Most programs and services based in Chilliwack moved to the new campus at CEP in 2012.

Chilliwack campus at Canada Education Park 

The South Chilliwack Campus is located at Canada Education Park (CEP). It houses the Trades and Technology Centre, which opened in 2009, the Faculty of Health Sciences building and the Agriculture Centre of Excellence, which opened in May and September 2012 respectively.

UFV Five Corners

In 2012, the university announced plans to open a satellite campus with a focus on programming related to business development and training in the Five Corners neighbourhood in Downtown Chilliwack. UFV Five Corners was located in a building donated to the university by Bank of Montreal. In 2018 it was shut down, and the building was leased out to the Chilliwack Economic Partners Corporation.

Hope
The Hope centre is a regional centre, run in partnership with the Fraser-Cascade school district.

Mission
In 1975, a temporary campus was established in Mission, offering continuing education and adult basic education programs.  In 1996, UFV and the Mission School District partnered to open the Heritage Park Centre.  This centre acts as a UFV campus, middle school, community theatre and fitness centre, all contained within a single facility.

Chandigarh, India
UFV India is located in Chandigarh, India within the Goswami Ganesh Dutta Sanatan Dharma College Chandigarh (SD College) campus in Sector 32-C. This international location was founded in 2006 to provide an alternative study option for Indian students looking to study in Canada.

Formal discussions began in 2003 between Panjab University and University College of the Fraser Valley (as it was then known) on educational collaborations. This resulted in a MoU in 2004, which included exploration of curriculum development and faculty and student exchange. It was also at this time that the idea of delivering UFV academic programs in India took shape, and in 2006, UFV and Goswami Ganesh Dutta Sanatan Dharma College (an affiliate of Punjab University) signed an agreement to deliver the Bachelor of Business Administration (BBA) program to Indian students at SD College.

Students who enroll in Canadian undergraduate programs UFV India choose from business, computer information systems, and liberal arts. After completing at least one full academic year, students have the option to apply for a campus transfer to the University of the Fraser Valley in Canada or other universities across Canada. Students transfer to Canada as a cohort or have the option to complete all four years of their Canadian undergraduate program at UFV India.

In addition to undergraduate programs, UFV India offers a pathway to a Master of Management (MoM) program at the University of Windsor. The Management Post-Baccalaureate Certificate Program is designed for Indian students with a three-year bachelor's degree who wish to pursue a master's degree in Canada. Students spend one-year at UFV India and then apply to the University of Windsor to complete their MoM.

The UFV India model allows students to stay close to home as they begin their international education. While in India, students are mentored by UFV India staff and faculty to develop skills relevant to succeeding in Canada.

Student life

Athletics

UFV is represented in U Sports by the UFV Cascades. The Envision Athletic Centre houses two gymnasiums, a fitness centre and change rooms.

In more than 25 years of varsity athletics, UFV has boasted a track record as one of the most decorated post-secondary athletic programs in the nation. The Cascades have amassed a total of three conference championships, 15 provincial championships, and have seen 129 student-athletes named provincial all-stars.

The UFV men's basketball team captured the school's first-ever conference title in 2000 and went on to take the title again in 2002, 2004, and 2006, giving them four conference championships in a seven-year span. The women's basketball team won five straight provincial championships, bringing their all-time total to ten.

UFV also offers non-competitive sports provided by clubs such as hip-hop dance, badminton, and cricket.

Residence

Opened in 2007, UFV has one student residence, Baker House, on the Abbotsford campus. It houses 102 suites with 204 bedrooms. Every suite contains a microwave and minifridge; however, meal plans can be purchased for $2,000, $1,500, or $1,000.

Student media
 The Cascade, student newspaper
The Cascade is the University of the Fraser Valley's student-run paper, with offices located on the university's campus in Abbotsford, British Columbia, Canada. While the paper's current era as The Cascade began in 1993, it began publication in the 1970s, under different names that would last only for a short number of years. 
 CIVL-FM, the campus radio station

Notable alumni
 Lauren Southern (withdrew), political activist and YouTuber
 Gwen O'Mahony - Former MLA in the 39th Parliament of British Columbia

Notable professors
 Hugh Brody - Canada Research Chair in Aboriginal Studies
 Trevor Carolan
 Ron Dart, political science
 Kseniya Garaschuk, mathematics

See also
 List of agricultural universities and colleges
 List of universities in British Columbia
 Higher education in British Columbia
 Education in Canada

References

External links

 
UFV History

 
1974 establishments in British Columbia
Agricultural universities and colleges in Canada
Educational institutions established in 1974
Universities in British Columbia
Vocational education in Canada